Elbrussky (masculine), Elbrusskaya (feminine), or Elbrusskoye (neuter) is the name of several inhabited localities in Russia.

Modern localities
Elbrussky (urban-type settlement), an urban-type settlement under the administrative jurisdiction of the town of republic significance of Karachayevsk in the Karachay-Cherkess Republic;

Alternative names
Elbrussky, alternative name of Elbrus, a selo in Elbrussky District of the Kabardino-Balkar Republic;